Košťál (Czech feminine: Košťálová) is a surname which means "stalk" in Czech. The name may refer to: 

Irwin Kostal (1911–1994), American musician
Jan Košťál (born 1980), Czech ice hockey player
Jindra Košťálová, Czech gymnast
Pavel Košťál (born 1980), Czech footballer
Růžena Košťálová (born 1924), Czech sprint canoer 
Zdeněk Košťál, Czech slalom canoer

See also

References

Czech-language surnames